is a Japanese film and television director.

Works
  Psychic Vision: Jaganrei  (film, 1988) 
Oira Sukeban: Kessen! Pansutō (film, 1992)
Gridman the Hyper Agent (TV series, 1993–1994)
Kuchisake-onna (film, 1996)
Kyōfu Shinbun (ja) (film, 1996)
Ultraman Tiga (TV series, 1996–1997)
Ultraman Dyna (TV series, 1997–1998)
Ultraman Cosmos (TV series, 2001–2002)
Genseishin Justirisers (TV series, 2004–2005)
Abashiri Ikka (film, 2009)
BIMA Satria Garuda (TV series, 2013)
Satria Garuda BIMA-X (TV series, 2014)
Bloody Doll (film, 2014)

References

Japanese film directors
Japanese television directors
Living people
Year of birth missing (living people)